Othen is a surname. Notable people with the surname include:

 Annie Othen, British journalist and broadcaster
 Geoffrey Othen (1933–2015), British cricketer

See also
 Otten

Surnames of English origin